Ron Ethan Yohann (born Fen Vialle; June 11, 1990) is an Indian film composer from Tamil Nadu. He made his debut in 2012 (credited as Fen Viallee) by composing score and songs for the Tamil film Sooriya Nagaram which didn't fare well both critically and commercially. His score for his second movie Maya in Tamil, received critical acclaim and subsequently, he was hired to compose score for the Priyadarshan-directed Malayalam film Oppam (2016).

Discography

Original films

Remakes

Singer

References

1990 births
Living people
Tamil film score composers